Antonije Pušić (born 14 June 1963), known professionally as Rambo Amadeus is a Montenegrin author. A self-titled "musician, poet, and media manipulator", he is a noted artist across the countries of former Yugoslavia.

His songs combine satirical lyrics on human nature and the silliness of local politics with a mixture of musical styles including jazz, rock, hip-hop and lately drum and bass, and self-conscious ironic wit; for example, his most popular alias is "Rambo Amadeus Svjetski Kilo Car" ("Rambo Amadeus the World Kilo Tzar"), formerly "Rambo Amadeus Svjetski Mega Car" ("Rambo Amadeus the World Mega Tzar") (RASMC) (changed in 2012 because of his belief in the importance of modesty in an environmentally conscious society). His stage name itself is made from John Rambo and Wolfgang Amadeus Mozart.

His concerts are never mere repetitions of recorded songs, but a mixture of free improvisation and satirical humor exploiting all aspects of human nature in a crude manner. Some fans compare his style with Frank Zappa and Captain Beefheart.

Rambo Amadeus represented Montenegro in the Eurovision Song Contest 2012 in Baku, Azerbaijan, with the song "Euro Neuro".

Early life
Antonije Pušić was born in Kotor, SR Montenegro, SFR Yugoslavia though his family lived in nearby Herceg Novi where he was raised. His writer and painter mother Bosiljka was born in Ćuprija and raised in Jagodina, Serbia before meeting Ilija Pušić from the coastal village of Kumbor near Herceg Novi and moving there upon marrying him. The couple soon moved to Herceg Novi proper and started a family. After completing elementary and secondary education in his hometown, Antonije graduated in tourism studies from the University of Belgrade's Faculty of Mathematics and Natural Sciences. He also completed six grades of elementary music school for piano before dropping out.

Before pursuing music and performing arts as a career choice, Pušić was an accomplished competitive sailor. Between 1972 and 1984, he represented Yugoslavia in numerous international regattas. During this period he was the Montenegrin champion several times, an 8-time South-Adriatic champion, national title winner in the junior category, as well as International Đerdap Cup winner in 1980. He still occasionally attends and participates in some recreational sailing regattas in the Gulf of Kotor.

He began to sing and compose during his first year of high school (gymnasium) which soon led to involvement with various local bands in Herceg Novi and Titograd. One of his first performances saw him play the mandolin in an orchestra entertaining guests at Herceg Novi's Plaza hotel.

In 1985, he moved to Belgrade in pursuit of higher education. Parallel to his university studies, he also played with various amateur bands and musicians.

Musical career

1970s
In 1979, Rambo Amadeus started off in a band called "Radioaktivni otpad," which was short lived. He was also in a band called "The Blues Band." He didn't like the content produced, so he rearranged the setup. The band lasted throughout his high school years, playing in Herceg Novi, Nikšić and Igalo (5 km distance from Herceg Novi).

1980s
In 1988, he dropped into the music scene out of nowhere with his debut album O tugo jesenja. His sound was a seemingly coarse blend of folkish ululations and opera, further mixed in with humorous lyrics and classic guitar riffs. Since very few people had prior knowledge of him, Rambo was delighted in creating confusion by introducing himself as Nagib Fazlić Nagon, a mine shaft operator who saved up enough money to record an album. He also jokingly referred to his own musical style as turbo folk, long before this term would begin to be applied to an actual musical style, which critics refer to with a grave social connotation and came to symbolise the moral and cultural decline throughout the Balkans during the wars of the 1990s.

Producer Saša Habić gave Rambo the opportunity to sign for the state television's record company PGP RTB (Rambo later wrote an anecdotal tribute to that event, in the hit song "Balkan Boy"). Habić also played the synthesiser on this album, from which a track named "Vanzemaljac" (Extraterrestrial) continues to be popular to this day. The record's sales weren't particularly high, but Rambo created enough of a buzz to remain active on the scene.

His next album Hoćemo gusle was released in 1989 and gave a small taste of Rambo's future musical direction – overt political satire. The track "Amerika i Engleska (biće zemlja proleterska)" was originally supposed to be named "Kataklizma komunizma" (Cataclysm of Communism) but local authorities did not allow it. The album title pokes fun at a bizarre event from the 1989 protests in Montenegro that eventually grew into the anti-bureaucratic revolution that swept Milo Đukanović, Momir Bulatović, and Svetozar Marović into power. Protesters were heard chanting "Hoćemo Ruse" ("We want the Russians"), but when the authorities and state-controlled media criticized them for it, many quickly began backpedaling by claiming they actually chanted "Hoćemo gusle" ("We want gusle").

Other songs like "Glupi hit" and the aforementioned "Balkan boy" would also become considerable hits. Rambo even received solid critical acclaim for chances he took in "Samit u buregdžinici Laibach". On that track, he created a catchy hybrid by mixing the unique sound of Laibach with lyrics borrowed from the poetry of Laza Kostić and Desanka Maksimović, as well as from folk kafana standard "Čaše lomim" mixing with his own humorous lyrics. The album sleeve lists the lyrics of a song that wasn't actually recorded, and explains that "it was dropped at the last moment because there was no room for it," but gives assurances that it would appear on the next album. Since the song in question, named "Pegepe ertebe," was all about taking shots at Rambo's label PGP RTB, but however, it didn't appear on the next or any other album.

1990s
In the early 1990s, Rambo was growing into an established performer. His third album Psihološko propagandni komplet M-91 came out towards the end of 1991 at a time when the breakup of the former Yugoslavia was already in full swing. For obvious reasons, the least of which was the album's subtitle – Psychological Propaganda Set, many songs contained heavy lyrics and a dark, militaristic atmosphere. In your face profanity and descriptive cursing was also par for the course, making this the first major music release in former Yugoslavia to take such narrative liberties. Tracks like "Smrt popa Mila Jovovića" (30-year-old poem by Božo Đuranović), "Jemo voli jem" (incorporating samples from Yugoslav aviators' anthem "Hej vojnici vazduhoplovci" as well as Šemsa Suljaković's "Izgubila sve sam bitke"), "Inspektor Nagib" and "Zdravo damo" became instant hits.

The discrepancy between what's listed on the cover and what is actually recorded is there again as sleeve announces the track called "KPGS" which would, this time for real, appear on the next live album, but does not list "Halid invalid Hari" and "Prijatelju, prijatelju" which were included and became big hits. Many consider the two tracks to be classic Rambo: observant, opinionated, direct and profane. The latter of the two originally included excerpts from Slobodan Milošević and Franjo Tuđman speeches, but the record company censors took them out.

This album further solidified Rambo's presence on the scene as he started playing bigger arenas like Sava centar. Due to his outspoken and entertaining nature he would often get invited on various TV and radio outlets across the country.

During "Belgrade spring" festival in 1992. he showed civil courage when he interrupted a concert by "Bebi Dol" during live TV broadcast and said to tens of thousands of viewers:

"As we play here bombs are falling on Dubrovnik and Tuzla. We won't entertain the political voters no more. F*** your mothers!" 

He threw the microphone on the floor, left the stage and the show was over.

Trying to take the new situation in stride, he hit the road, becoming one of the first performers from FR Yugoslavia to regularly start touring Macedonia and Slovenia in the years following those states' declarations of independence.

After the live album KPGS (taped on 29 December 1992 in Skopje) that included the new studio track "Karamba karambita" followed by a greatest hits compilation Izabrana dela 1989–1994, Rambo recorded peculiar new material during July 1995 in Paris with Goran Vejvoda. Released the following year as Mikroorganizmi, it featured an inaccessible, moody sound garnered with terse, experimental music marking a sizable departure from his usual antics.

He simultaneously released Muzika za decu, a personal musical take on Ljubivoje Ršumović's poetry featuring two bonus new tracks – "Sex" and "ABVGD".

Old-school Rambo fans did not have to wait long for a return to earlier style. Towards the end of 1996, on Titanik he delivered a new batch of traditional fare like "Šakom u glavu", "Sado-mazo", "Zreo za penziju" and "Otiš'o je svak ko valja" (dedicated to Toma Zdravković and members of Šarlo Akrobata). Seasoned musicians like Ognjen Radivojević (who would become famous for working with such musicians like Goran Bregović and Zdravko Čolić), Goran Ljuboja, Dragan Markovski and Marija Mihajlović) took part in recording sessions for this album.

An extensive tour followed and it again included Slovenia (a live album was recorded over two Ljubljana concerts in April 1997 and later released as Koncert u KUD France Prešeren), as well as Bosnia where Rambo appeared as a guest at Sejo Sexon's Zabranjeno pušenje gig in Sarajevo. That appearance in December 1997 was the first post-war visit by a Montenegrin performer to Bosnia.

On 9 June 1998 Rambo played Belgrade's Dom Sindikata hall in what he announced to be the farewell performance before retirement. Even if many doubted his sincerity, the concert was a memorable one. Soon, Rambo packed his bags and left for the Netherlands, though not before squeezing in two more shows in Bosnia. In the Netherlands, he worked a series of menial jobs including construction, before deciding to return to Belgrade after only four months abroad. Back home, not surprisingly, he also returned to music and continued to break down inter-ethnic barriers: on 10 December 1998 he and Margita Stefanović played a show in Pula at the local cinema with KUD Idijoti, which was a first opportunity since the war for a Croatian audience to see performers from Serbia and Montenegro.

2000s
Throughout 2000, Rambo worked on what would eventually become the Don't Happy, Be Worry album. This album included the song Laganese which sampled the Norwegian journalist Åsne Seierstad singing the Norwegian Folk song Eg rodde meg ut på seiegrunnen and swearing. By this time, sampling and local pop-cultural references had become two more staples of his sound, and this material, too, was heavy on both. Produced by Iztok Turk, it featured tracks like "Čoban je upravo napustio zgradu" (loose cover of Neda Ukraden's "Zora je svanula"), "Moj skutere" that borrows from Oliver Dragojević's "Moj galebe", and "Izađite molim" with sprinkled in dialogues from Goran Marković's 1975 movie Variola vera.

In 2004, Rambo released his third live album Bolje jedno vruće pivo nego četri ladna, which was followed by the studio album Oprem dobro in mid-2005.

He made a song "Dikh tu kava" in collaboration with ethno-jazz fusion band Kal, and in 2007 he appeared on their album as a featured artist in the song "Komedija" ("Comedy").

In autumn 2007 he did a performance called "Mixing of alternative rocks", when he "played" on 12 concrete mixers in front of the audience during The Alternative Rock Festival in SKC, Belgrade.

For the purpose of the New Year's show on RTV, he appeared in the song "Rakija" followed by Zorule, the traditional folk orchestra. This song was used later as one of the tracks for "Vratiće se rode" TV serial. In February 2008, Rambo Amadeus performed as a guest star of The RTS Big Band jazz orchestra, for their 60th Anniversary.

Hipishizik Metafizik  is his latest studio album, released for PGP RTS in July 2008.

2010s
Rambo Amadeus was internally selected by the Montenegrin national broadcaster RTCG to represent Montenegro in the Eurovision Song Contest 2012 in Baku, Azerbaijan. His winning song "Euro Neuro" gained controversy for its video. He ultimately succeeded in his goal of obtaining a very low ranking in the competition and announced that he is honoured to have written the worst song on Eurovision.

 In 2013, he released a video for the new single O'Ruk on the Road Again with Three Winnettous.

In 2015, he released the album "Vrh Dna", which featured previously unreleased track "Rano Za Početak" from 2011, and he retitled it "Samo Balade" for the album's release.

In 2016, he landed two voice-work roles, as Mighty Eagle in the Croatian-language and Serbian-language version of The Angry Birds Movie, and as Crush in the Serbian-language version of Finding Dory.

In 2018, he tried to represent Serbia in the Eurovision Song Contest 2018 with the song Nema Te, a duet with jazz singer Beti Đorđević. They performed the song in Beovizija 2018. and came 9th.

Other endeavours
In addition to a prolific solo recording career, Rambo frequently engaged in different, often bizarre side projects.

In 1989 in Sarajevo, for a short while, he hosted an erotic quiz show with actress Jasna Beri named Turbo-lilihip, which aired on a local TV station SA3.
Rambo also wrote lyrics for commercial folk stars like Lepa Brena and Vesna Zmijanac, as well as the entire score for the 1994 film , which was a star vehicle for another folk performer Dragana Mirković.
In 1994, he also wrote a musical score for the 1927 silent movie Metropolis by Fritz Lang. At a movie screening at Sava Center, Rambo's music was played by the Belgrade Philharmonic. The material was later recorded by Rambo himself along with Miroslav Savić and Heavily Manipulated Orchestra, and released as Metropolis B (Tour-de-Force)
A year later, he arranged a cadenza within "A concerto for piano and orchestra in C-minor" by W.A. Mozart. In 1995, this cadenza was performed by Ivan Tasovac, while the entire concert was conducted by Oskar Danon at Belgrade's Kolarac concert hall.
Since early 2005, Rambo has written a column  (Mega-Imperial Thoughts) for the daily tabloid Blic.
  In December 2010, he was a guest on Studio B's Agape program together with Serbian Orthodox bishop Porfirije where they talked about the meaning of life, finding ones's self way in life, slowing down, drug abuse and rehabilitation (Rambo confessed to using marijuana for 20 years).
 Rambo has done voice-work for the Serbian-Croatian language dubs of The Lion King franchise, Despicable Me, Ice Age: Continental Drift, Madagascar 3: Europe's Most Wanted, The Angry Birds Movie and Finding Dory.

Discography

Studio albums
 1988 – O tugo jesenja
 1989 – Hoćemo gusle
 1991 – Psihološko propagandni komplet M-91 
 1995 – Muzika za decu
 1996 – Mikroorganizmi
 1997 – Titanik
 1998 – Metropolis B (tour-de-force)
 2000 – Don't happy, be worry (Released as Čobane vrati se in Slovenia and Croatia)
 2005 – Oprem Dobro
 2008 – Hipishizik Metafizik
 2015 – Vrh Dna
 2020 - Brod budala

EPs
2008 – Yes No

Live albums
1993 – Kurac, Pička, Govno, Sisa
1997 – Koncert u KUD France Prešeren
2004 – Bolje jedno vruće pivo nego četri ladna
2011 – Rambo Amadeus & Mutant Dance Sextet u Domu Sindikata

Compilations
1994 – Izabrana dela
1998 – Zbrana dela 1
1998 – Zbrana dela 2

Backing band members
Current members
 Rambo Amadeus (World Kilo Tzar) – guitar, fretless guitar, vocals, arrangement

Live members
 Miroslav Tovirac – bass (2012–)
 Igor Malešević – drums, percussion (2012)

Also associated
 Aleksandra Kovač – vocals
 Kristina Kovač – vocals
 Nenad Knežević-Knez – vocals
 Goran Ljuboja "Trut" – drums
 Mihajlo Krstić – bass
 Vladimir Čukić – bass
 Vojo Dizdar – keyboards
 Digital Mandrak
 Goran Vejvoda
 Gojko Sisa
 Ilija Milutinović "Popara"
 Vitez Šablon Dimija

References

Janjatovic, Petar. Ilustrovana ex-Yu rock enciklopedija 1960–2000 (dopunjeno izdanje). Novi Sad: Prometej, 2001.

External links

Official website
Official MySpace page
Official YouTube page
Official Facebook page
Official Twitter page

1963 births
Living people
People from Kotor
21st-century Montenegrin male singers
Montenegrin singer-songwriters
Yugoslav musicians
University of Belgrade alumni
Eurovision Song Contest entrants of 2012
Eurovision Song Contest entrants for Montenegro
Jazz fusion  musicians
Montenegrin people of Serbian descent
Male jazz musicians
20th-century Montenegrin male singers
Beovizija contestants